Monmouth Battlefield State Park is a  New Jersey state park located on the border of Manalapan and Freehold Township, in Monmouth County, New Jersey, United States. This park preserves the historical battlefield on which the American Revolutionary War's Battle of Monmouth (1778) was waged. It was added to the National Register of Historic Places for its significance in military history.

Appearance and information

Monmouth Battlefield State Park preserves a rural eighteenth-century landscape of orchards, fields, woods and wetlands, encompassing miles of trails for hiking and horseback riding, space for picnic areas, and a restored Revolutionary War farmhouse called the Craig House.

The park's visitor center rests atop Combs Hill, a hill commanded by the Continental Army artillery. Within the park's visitor's center an array of excavated artifacts from battle are on display. On December 5, 2011, the Monmouth Battlefield Visitor Center was closed for renovations through Spring 2013. The renovated Visitors Center was officially reopened on June 13, 2013.

Every second weekend of June (usually Father’s Day weekend), an annual reenactment of the 1778 American Revolutionary War battle is performed and has been so for decades.

The battlefield is traversed by the rights-of-way (ROW) used by the Farmingdale and Squan Village Railroad/Freehold and Jamesburg Agricultural Railroad and is under consideration for use as part of the Monmouth Ocean Middlesex Line.

History of the battlefield

On June 28, 1778, as Sir Henry Clinton and his troops departed from the Monmouth Court House, George Washington and his Continental Army troops plotted an ambush on the rear column of Clinton's British Army soldiers. It became one of the largest battles of the American Revolution. It took place in the fields and forests that now make up Monmouth Battlefield State Park, though the battle soon ended in a standoff.

The Battle of Monmouth is notable for creating the American legend of Molly Pitcher, a housewife who boldly took her husband's place at the cannon only moments after his death. In honor of Pitcher, a white cenotaph was erected near the property of the battlefield.

Historic farmhouses and structures of the battlefield

The site of the battlefield originally contained many colonial-era farmhouses though many did not survive the rapid development of the area in the 20th century. Three of the original seven farmhouses that were present during the battle are still standing in the park. These include the Sutfin Farmhouse (1731); the Rhea-Applegate House (1745); and the Craig House (1746).

Three other homes were built on the battlefield. The Conover-Perrine House (1832) is to the north of the park, erected on the site of the original 18th-century Perrine House, an important example of late Federal Architecture. The Italianate Cobb House was later constructed in 1872 near the Conover-Perrine House. The Combs' Farmhouse (mid-18th Century) was demolished sometime in the 1960s and was located near the park's playground and ice pond.

References

External links 

Official Site
Photo gallery

Historic districts on the National Register of Historic Places in New Jersey
1778 in the United States
American Revolutionary War sites
National Historic Landmarks in New Jersey
Museums in Monmouth County, New Jersey
American Revolutionary War museums in New Jersey
Historic house museums in New Jersey
Parks in Monmouth County, New Jersey
Houses in Monmouth County, New Jersey
Freehold Township, New Jersey
Manalapan Township, New Jersey
State parks of New Jersey
National Register of Historic Places in Monmouth County, New Jersey
New Jersey Register of Historic Places
American Revolution on the National Register of Historic Places